The 1971–72 Greek Football Cup was the 30th edition of the Greek Football Cup. The competition culminated with the Greek Cup Final, held at Karaiskakis Stadium, on 5 July 1972. The match was contested by PAOK and Panathinaikos, with PAOK winning by 2–1.

Calendar

Knockout phase
In the knockout phase, teams play against each other over a single match. If the match ends up as a draw, extra time will be played. If a winner doesn't occur after the extra time the winner emerges by penalty shoot-out.The mechanism of the draws for each round is as follows:
In the draw for the first round, the teams from the first division are seeded and the teams from the second division were unseeded. The seeded teams are drawn against the unseeded teams in each region.
In the draws for the second round onwards, there are no seedings and teams from the different region can be drawn against each other.

First round

|}

Second round

|}

Additional round

|}

Bracket

Round of 16

|}

Quarter-finals

|}

*The match was suspended at 89th minute because Aris' players started a fight with the referee. That remained as the final score.

Semi-finals

|}

Final

The 28th Greek Cup Final was played at the Karaiskakis Stadium.

References

External links
Greek Cup 1971-72 at RSSSF

Greek Football Cup seasons
Greek Cup
Cup